Stewart Johnson (1880 - 1926) was an American diplomat who served as the States Secretary of Legation in Costa Rica.

After Edward J. Hale was recalled in 1917, Johnson handled the department of Minister of Foreign Affairs of Costa Rica. Johnson married Miss Catherine ReQua on November 17, 1917.

He graduated from Harvard Law School in 1907.

References

1880 births
1926 deaths
Ambassadors of the United States to Costa Rica
Harvard Law School alumni